Grater cake is a dessert of grated coconut in a fondant of sugar in Jamaican cuisine. While refined, or white sugar, is now often used, when "wet" or "new" brown sugar was used, it was known as grater brute.

See also
Toto (dessert)
Gizzada
 List of Jamaican dishes

References

Jamaican desserts
Foods containing coconut
Jamaican cuisine